Eyeworks Touchdown (formerly Touchdown Television) is a New Zealand-based television production company specialising in reality and unscripted formats, which has become a leader in the field in New Zealand, and the world. Its formats include The Chair and Treasure Island, as well as many others.

History
Touchdown Television was started by producer Julie Christie in 1991, initially producing documentaries, then moving on to some reality shows, including travel and adventure series such as Mountain Dew On The Edge and Travel.co.nz, as well as foreign formats such as Changing Rooms, and Ready Steady Cook.

More recently the company has focused on creating formats for local television as well as formats for international sale. These include Treasure Island and The Chair which have both been produced in a number of countries.

In 2004, Touchdown produced a joint-venture show called The Resort for broadcasters Network Ten (Aus) and TV3 (NZ), allowing voting and featuring contestants from both countries, the show did not rate as well as hoped and was ended early when contestants failed to meet the demands of the competition.

On February 8, 2006, Touchdown was sold to Dutch TV company Eyeworks and has been renamed Eyeworks Touchdown since April 1, 2006.

Eyeworks Touchdown began production of a New Zealand series of Dragons Den in mid-2006 which screened later that year on TV One and is currently casting for a second series.

On February 11, 2014, the Warner Bros. Television Group announced that it will purchase Eyeworks' businesses outside of the United States. The acquisition was completed on June 2 of that year. The acquisition gives Warner Bros. TV production units in 15 additional territories.

Programmes
Programmes Touchdown has produced include the following:

 Top of the Class
 At Home on their Own
 DIY Rescue
 Going Straight
 My House My Castle
 Game of Two Halves
 The Resort
 Treasure Island
 Treasure Island Extreme
 Celebrity Treasure Island
 So You Wannabe A Popstar?
 Ready Steady Cook
 Miss Popularity
 City Celebrity Country Nobody
 Matthew and Marc's Rocky Road
 Hot Property
 How Normal Are You?
 The Fence
 The Chair
 Captive
 Common Law
 Garden Wars
 The Sports Hour - All Fired Up
 April's Angels
 Arnotts Dreams Come True
 Bounty Hunter
 Can You Hackett
 Circus
 Coke RTR
 Colonial House
 Coming Home
 DIY Dads
 DIY Fantasies
 Driving School NZ
 Finding J Smith
 Ground Force
 Home on Their Own
 House Dates
 It's Your Money
 Living The Dream
 Mike King
 Money Doctor
 Park Rangers
 Pioneer House
 Profilers
 Property Rescue
 Some Like It Hot
 The GC
 The Mating Game
 The Money Game
 The Player
 This Is your Life
 Trading Places
 Troubleshooters
 Unichem Medlife
 Unsolved
 Weakest Link
 Weddings
 Whose House Is It Anyway?
 World Famous
 You've Gotta Have It

References

External links
Official site
Touchdown TV (International)
Eyeworks TV - Eyeworks Television
Hugh Palmer's Blog - A story about being on 'Home on their Own'

Television production companies of New Zealand
Companies based in Auckland